Carlo Bergonzi may refer to:

 Carlo Bergonzi (luthier) (1683–1747), Italian luthier
 Carlo Bergonzi (tenor) (1924–2014), Italian operatic tenor